Imamu Amiri Mayfield (born April 19, 1972) is an American professional boxer who competed from 1994 to 2008, and 2016 to 2017.

Career
Mayfield turned pro in 1994 and was a popular local fighter known for being on boxing cards in various New Jersey venues.  He won the IBF Cruiserweight Title with a win over Uriah Grant in 1997. In his first Title defense Mayfield traveled to Hull, England and defeated formerly unbeaten British champion Terry Dunstan by KO. The next year, being promoted by the infamous Don "Only in America" King, lost a purse bid to M and M promotions. Mayfield was supposed to fight Saul Montana after coming off a tough title defense against Dunstan but instead was forced to fight a mandatory defense against Arthur Williams. He lost the belt to Arthur Williams via a 9th round TKO.  In 2000, he earned a shot at WBC Cruiserweight Title holder Juan Carlos Gomez, but lost by KO in the 3rd round. Mayfield asked to be released from DKP sighting irreconcilable issues. Mayfield then signed with the before mentioned M and M and won the USBA title in Atlantic City, New Jersey with a KO over up and coming contender Gary Wilcox. The next year he lost an IBF Cruiserweight Title Eliminator bout against Jorge Fernando Castro.

In 2002, he then moved up to heavyweight, where in his first fight as a heavy was significantly undersized. He went on to clearly outpoint and hurt Peter Ohkello. Ohkello went on to fight for the WBC heavy weight Title in 2006 in Russia. Although he drew with Taurus Sykes in 2003, he was TKO'd in 2004 by journeyman Lawrence Clay Bey. After the loss to Clay Bey, he moved back down to Cruiserweight.

Mayfield moved back up to heavyweight again and took on Alexander Povetkin in 2006, and lost via a third round TKO. This was followed by another stoppage loss to rising contender Johnathon Banks.

He also competed in one mixed martial arts bout, against Japanese wrestler Kazuyuki Fujita at Inoki Bom-Ba-Ye 2003 on December 31 (New Year's Eve), 2003. The rules of the fight dictated that the fighters would be stood up after 20 seconds on the ground, which made the fight fairer for Mayfield given his lack of grappling skills. Fujita was able to choke Mayfield unconscious while he was still standing in the second round.

Professional boxing record

Mixed martial arts record

|-
|Loss
|align=center|0-1
| Kazuyuki Fujita
|Submission (arm-triangle choke)
|Inoki Bom-Ba-Ye 2003
|
|align=center|2
|align=center|2:15
|Kobe, Japan
|

See also
List of world cruiserweight boxing champions

References

External links

1972 births
Living people
American male boxers
Boxers from New Jersey
People from Freehold Borough, New Jersey
Sportspeople from Perth Amboy, New Jersey
African-American boxers
21st-century African-American sportspeople
20th-century African-American sportspeople
American male mixed martial artists
African-American mixed martial artists
Mixed martial artists from New Jersey
Heavyweight mixed martial artists
Mixed martial artists utilizing boxing
Cruiserweight boxers
Heavyweight boxers
World cruiserweight boxing champions
International Boxing Federation champions